Bu bu zhui zong (English title: Chase Step by Step; Chinese: 步步追杀) is a 1974 Taiwanese film directed by Yu Min Sheong.

The film is also known as Bu bu zhui sha in Hong Kong (Mandarin title).

Plot summary 
Two circus performers are tasked with escorting relief in the form of gold bullion to a region hit by drought. On the way they are beset by countless bandits. The marauders, of course, are waiting for them around every corner and they are besieged at each step. Also present are elements of romantic tension and some vaguely historical political references.

Cast
Barry Chan
Shu Lin Chang
Chung-Lien Chou
Ping Ge
Feng Hsu
Yun Lan
Hua Li
Kuang Yung Lin
Ka-Niu Na
Ming Tsan Pan
San-di Shi
Kuo-Liang Su
Liang Tai
Meng Tien
Ching Kang Tsai
Chao Tseng
Fei Wang
Kai Wang
Kuan-Hung Wang
Hsieh Li Wu
Min-hsiung Wu
Fung Yue

Soundtrack

References

External links

1974 films
1970s action adventure films
1970s Mandarin-language films
Taiwanese action films